Carlos McConnie is a Puerto Rican television host and actor. He hosts the show Euromaxx produced by Deutsche Welle, and appeared on Univision's Sábado Gigante.

Early life and education
Born in San Juan, Puerto Rico, McConnie attended Robinson High School. He earned his Bachelors in Business Administration and Masters in Communications degrees.

History
McConnie appeared as a host on MTV Puerto Rico before he was cast for WAPA-TV's show Jangueo TV in 2007. He later became co-host of Univision Puerto Rico's weekly entertainment newscast Flashazo VIP in 2009. In 2011, McConnie became a guest-host on Telefuturas daily show Escándalo TV. He made his acting debut in the TV movie El Corillo in 2012.

McConnie moved to Los Angeles, California in 2013. There he started acting in short films and hosted web-based shows, including Actors E Chat Show and ¡Enterate! con McConnie before he was recruited by Univision Network in Miami, Florida. He was a presenter on the show Mira Quien Baila, and then became a co-host on Nuestra Belleza Latina in 2014, as well as their aftershows, MQB Extra and NBL Extra. He co-hosted Sábado Gigante with Don Francisco, and in 2015 became host of Deutsche Welle's culture magazine Euromaxx for its editions in Spanish and English.

Filmography

References

External links
 

Year of birth missing (living people)
Living people
People from San Juan, Puerto Rico
Puerto Rican television hosts